Ningthoukhongjam Rohen Singh (born 1 March 2003) is an Indian professional footballer who plays as a defender for East Bengal in the Indian Super League.

Career 
Born in Manipur, Rohen Singh began his career with East Bengal. He made his first professional debut for Indian Super league side East Bengal on 26 December 2020 against Chennaiyin. He came on as a 46th minute substitute for Surchandra Singh as East Bengal drew the match 2–2.

Statistics

See also 

 Surchandra Singh
 Haobam Singh

References

External links 

 Soccerway profile
 Indian Super League profile

East Bengal Club players
Living people
Indian Super League players
Association football defenders
Indian footballers
2003 births
Footballers from Manipur